The Officers' Training Corps (OTC), more fully called the University Officers' Training Corps (UOTC), are military leadership training units operated by the British Army. Their focus is to develop the leadership abilities of their members whilst giving them an opportunity to take part in military life whilst at university. OTCs also organise non-military outdoor pursuits such as hill walking and mountaineering. UOTC units are not deployable units nor are their cadets classed as trained soldiers until completion of MOD 1 training (equivalent to Phase 1 for Enlisted Army Reserve soldiers). The majority of members of the UOTC do not go on to serve in the regular or reserve forces.

History

General history of the units
The emergence of the Officers' Training Corps as a distinct unit began in 1906, when the Secretary of State for War, Lord Haldane, first appointed a committee to consider the problem of the shortage of officers in the Militia, the Volunteer Force, the Yeomanry, and the Reserve of Officers. The committee recommended that an Officers' Training Corps be formed. The Corps was to be in two divisions: a junior division in public schools and a senior division in the universities. In October 1908, therefore, authorised by Army Order 160 of July 1908, as part the Haldane Reforms of the Reserve forces, the contingents were formally established as the Officers' Training Corps and incorporated into the new Territorial Force, which was created by the Territorial and Reserve Forces Act 1907.

During the First World War, the OTCs became officer producing units and some 20,577 officers and 12,290 other ranks were recruited from the OTCs between August
1914 and March 1915. The Munich Crisis saw a huge increase in recruitment to military units generally and OTCs in particular as large numbers of people volunteered for military service in the prelude to the Second World War. At the start of the Second World War the UOTCs became Senior Training Units (STCs) and their membership automatically joined the Home Guard and in 1948 they became University Training Units (UTCs).

From 1910 to 1922, Dublin University Officers' Training Corps recruited students at Trinity College Dublin, reinforcing the university's reputation at the time as a stronghold of Irish unionism and opposition to Home Rule. During the 1916 Easter Rising, Trinity College was targeted by the Volunteer and Citizen Army forces, but was successfully defended by a small number of unionist students, most of whom were UOTC cadets, as well as some staff. In the first meeting of the College Board following the Easter Rising, the Provost, J. P. Mahaffy, proposed a resolution expressing gratitude to those who had defended the university. In July that year, Dublin UOTC were offered, as a further gesture of thanks, the gift of a silver cup by the Ulster Unionist MP for Dublin University, Sir Edward Carson; the cup was ultimately gifted to the university itself in trust for its UOTC. Eventually, Dublin UOTC was disbanded following the partition of Ireland.

In 1948, the senior OTC divisions became part of the Territorial Army, and women were accepted for the first time with the formation of Women's Royal Army Corps sub-units. Women are now fully integrated into all sections. The junior divisions, by then renamed the Junior Training Corps, became the Army Sections of the Combined Cadet Force. The units became University Officers' Training Corps (UOTCs) again in 1955.

There are now fifteen UOTCs and two Officer Training Regiments (OTRs) throughout the United Kingdom, each of which serves the universities and Army Reserve units in a distinct geographic area. Those serving larger areas may have several detachments. Each UOTC is effectively an independent regiment, with its own cap badge, its own stable belt, and its own customs and traditions. UOTC members are classed as officer cadets (OCdt), despite the majority not having passed officer selection, and are members of the Army Reserve, paid when on duty. They are not classed as trained ranks and cannot be mobilised for active service. Officer cadets can gain appointments as a Junior Under Officer (JUO), a Company Under Officer (CUO), or a Senior Under Officer (SUO) and, like civilians, can also apply to the Army Officer Selection Board (AOSB), which, if they pass, leads to the opportunity to attempt the Army Reserve Commissioning Course with the goal of a commission as a second lieutenant. Officer cadets have no obligation to join the armed forces when they leave university and can resign from the UOTC at any time. UOTCs are led by officers and non-commissioned officers from the Regular Army and Army Reserve.

Individual units

Aberdeen

The first military unit formed by the University of Aberdeen was a battery of the 1st Aberdeen Volunteer Royal Artillery, raised in December 1885. The battery was officered by members of the university staff and commanded by Captain William Stirling, then professor of physiology.  In March 1895, the University Battery was absorbed by the 1st Heavy Battery.  In November 1897, an Aberdeen University detachment of the 1st Volunteer Battalion, Gordon Highlanders, was recruited, and in 1898 the detachment became University Company ("U" Company). In 1912, the Aberdeen University contingent of the Officers' Training Corps was formally raised in response to the recommendations of the committee formed by Lord Haldane under the chairmanship of the then principal Sir George Adam Smith. The War Office authorised the formation of a medical unit and appointed as Commanding Officer Major G A Williamson MA MD DPH.

"U" Company had by this time become part of the 4th Battalion, Gordon Highlanders, and at the outbreak of the First World War was mobilised and sent to France, the only university contingent to go. The story of "U" Company as a fighting unit is told by Alexander Rule in his book Students Under Arms.

In February 1924, the War Office authorised the establishment of an infantry unit and the right to wear the Gordon tartan.  The infantry unit was commanded initially by Major John Boyd Orr DSO MC (later John Boyd Orr, 1st Baron Boyd-Orr). The pipe band was instituted in 1924 and became one of the most popular features of the unit.  In 1929, the Scots Guards provided the senior warrant officer of the permanent staff and established a Household Division link. In 1935, it was decided that the cap badge, which up to then had been the university crest, should be replaced by the boar's head, the family crest of the founder of the university, with the motto "Non Confundar" ('I shall not be troubled').

During the Second World War, the unit expanded as all students of military age who had been granted deferment were required to enroll as part of a National Service obligation. At its peak, the unit was some 491 strong with four infantry companies, two medical companies and a signals section. Throughout the war, the unit in conjunction with the university ran special technical courses for Royal Artillery cadets, of which a total of 427 attended. In February 1943, the unit provided the backbone of the 9th City of Aberdeen (University Home Guard) Battalion, in addition to its normal role.

In October 1948, Medical, Royal Electrical and Mechanical Engineers, Intelligence, Royal Engineers, Royal Signals and infantry sub-units were formed. As a result of various re-organisations over the years, only the last three sub-units survive today. In 1951, women were allowed to join the UOTC and a Women's Royal Army Corps sub-unit was formed; this has now been absorbed into the existing three sub-units. The unit is now based at Gordon Barracks in Bridge of Don.

Birmingham
In 1900 the University of Birmingham raised a company, sanctioned by the War Office, which was known as U Company of the 1st Volunteer Battalion, Royal Warwickshire Regiment. Captain W. E. Bennett, one of the staff of the University, was given the command. The Company held its first parade in May 1900 and the occasion was celebrated by the presentation of the Inter-Section Challenge Cup by the Chancellor of the University, Joseph Chamberlain. In 1900 the Volunteers, of which U Company was part, were 1,406 strong.

In 1908, the Birmingham University contingent of the Officers' Training Corps was formally raised in response to the recommendations of the committee formed by Lord Haldane. Field Marshal William Slim, 1st Viscount Slim was a member of the Birmingham UOTC from 1912 to 1914. Birmingham UOTC is based at Montgomery House in Sparkbrook.

Bristol
In 1910, the Bristol University contingent of the Officers' Training Corps was formally raised in response to the recommendations of the committee formed by Lord Haldane. Some 1,000 men joined the Bristol UTC during the course of the First World War and, of these, some 105 were killed in action during that war. In 1925 it provided the Guard of honour for the visit of King George V and Queen Mary to Bristol to open buildings for the University of Bristol. It undertook its training collectively with other universities until 1928 when it arranged its own annual camp. During the Second World War twenty-one cadets volunteered for immediate service. Bristol UOTC is based at the Artillery Grounds in Whiteladies Road, Bristol.

Cambridge

Cambridge UOTC claims descent from a unit raised in 1803, when, with Britain under threat of French invasion, undergraduates from the University of Cambridge formed a corps of Volunteers to help defend British shores. Thereafter, the Cambridge University Rifle Volunteers (CURV) was formally raised in 1860.   During British involvement in the Second Boer War in 1899 there was a public focus on volunteering for the forces serving in South Africa. In response to this, a detachment was sent to South Africa.

Attached to the Suffolk Regiment, the CURV men reported for duty on 20 January 1900 in Bury St Edmunds. On 11 February, they sailed from Southampton on the SS Doune Castle, arriving in Cape Town on 7 March. Initially the Cambridge Volunteers worked as guards on the railway lines around Cape Town, but then marched with the Suffolk Regiment as part of General Bryan Mahon's column to attack a Boer position in Barberton in September 1900. With a large welcome home awaiting them, including a service in Great St Mary's Church, the volunteers were back in Cambridge on 6 May 1901. All the Volunteers were made Honorary Freemen of the Borough of Cambridge and on 21 December 1904, three years later, CURV was granted the battle honour "South Africa 1900-01". Cambridge is the only UOTC to have earned a battle honour.

In 1908, Cambridge University contingent of the Officers' Training Corps was formally raised in response to the recommendations of the committee formed by Lord Haldane and consisted of a battalion of infantry, a squadron of cavalry, a battery of artillery and medical and engineering units. During the First World War, Cambridge UOTC supplied 3,000 officers to the British Army between August 1914 and March 1915: this was more than any other UOTC. During the Second World War, Cambridge UOTC raised the 8th (Cambridge University) Cambridgeshire Battalion of the Cambridgeshire Regiment. Cambridge UOTC is based at the Army Reserve Centre in Coldham's Lane, Cambridge.

East Midlands

The University College Nottingham Officers' Training Corps was first formed on 27 April 1909 when 27 students from University College Nottingham petitioned the university's Senate Council to form a contingent of the Officers' Training Corps. Their petition was accepted by the War Office and later that same year, the unit was formed.

The names of those who died in both World Wars are recorded on a plaque in the University of Nottingham's Trent Building. The name of the unit was changed in 1966 to the "East Midlands Universities Officers' Training Corps" in a move that allowed volunteers from all higher education institutions in the East Midlands to join.

East Midlands UOTC's cap badge is that of the Sherwood Foresters, with replaced wording. As part of the unit's historic affiliations with the Sherwood Foresters (since amalgamated into the Worcestershire and Sherwood Foresters Regiment and, later, into 2nd Battalion, Mercian Regiment before it was disbanded in 2022), East Midlands Universities OTC's stable belt is horizontally green, maroon and green again, charged with a thin central horizontal silver strip for differentiation known as the 'silver stripe of learning.' East Midlands UOTC is based at the Army Reserve Centre, Broadgate in Beeston.

Edinburgh

Edinburgh UOTC has its origins in No. 4 Company of the 1st City of Edinburgh Rifle Volunteer Corps (from 1865 the 1st Queen's Edinburgh Rifle Volunteer Brigade), which was raised on 31 August 1859. Some 90 volunteers from the University of Edinburgh joined the company. In 1908, the Edinburgh University contingent of the Officers' Training Corps was formally raised in response to the recommendations of the committee formed by Lord Haldane (the Haldane Reforms). Haldane was Rector of the University of Edinburgh at the time. 'A' Company of 3rd Battalion, Queen's Edinburgh Rifles, Royal Scots, (the old No 4 Company) and Left Half of 1st Heavy Battery, 1st Edinburgh (City) Royal Garrison Artillery (also manned by members of the university) transferred to the new contingent. Some 2,250 students from the university were commissioned during the First World War.

The unit moved to the former Queen's Edinburgh Rifles' Forrest Hill drill hall in 1957: it became the "Edinburgh and Heriot-Watt Universities OTC" in 1966 and the "City of Edinburgh Universities OTC" in 1993. It moved to Duke of Edinburgh House in Colinton Road, Edinburgh in 1993.

Exeter
A UOTC was formed in Exeter in the late 1930s, but after supplying officers to the British Army during the Second World War, recruitment fell and the UOTC was placed in suspended animation in November 1947. The UOTC was formed on 1 April 1980 to provide military training for the students of the University of Exeter. Initially based at Higher Barracks, Exeter, the UOTC moved to Wyvern Barracks in February 1988, when Major-General Sir John Acland, its first honorary colonel, opened the Acland Building.

Glasgow and Strathclyde

The origins of the University of Glasgow's links with the military can be traced back to the Jacobite risings of 1715 and 1745, when companies of Militia were raised to defend the pro-Hanoverian University and the City of Glasgow against the absolutist Highland Jacobites. In 1880s, Glasgow professors such as William John Macquorn Rankine and students formed two infantry companies as part of the local 1st Lanarkshire (Glasgow 1st Western) Rifle Volunteers. This unit later became the 5th Battalion of the Cameronians (Scottish Rifles), based at West Princes Street drill hall in the Woodlands area of Glasgow.

In 1908, the Glasgow University contingent of the Officers' Training Corps was formally raised in response to the recommendations of the committee formed by Lord Haldane and consisted of three infantry companies and an engineering company. The new unit was located in its own drill hall at University Place on the Glasgow University campus.

During the First World War, UOTC members were amongst the first to volunteer, and Glasgow UOTC trained many potential officers for Kitchener's New Armies. By the summer of 1916, some 2,800 officers had been raised by the University.

In the Second World War, conscription was introduced immediately, and every student was regarded as a potential officer. The UOTC's role was to train officers from those University students conscripted into the Army and to provide basic training for those who remained behind as a Home Guard unit. At its height the Corps rose to 1,500 members. Glasgow UOTC remains based at the drill hall in University Place.

London

In 1909, the London University contingent of the Officers' Training Corps was formally raised in response to the recommendations of the committee formed by Lord Haldane. By autumn 1914 the University of London had enrolled 950 students in the UOTC. During the First World War, University of London OTC supplied 500 officers to the British Army between August 1914 and March 1915 alone. Some 665 officers, trained by the ULOTC, died during the whole of the First World War and some 245 officers, trained by the ULOTC, died in the Second World War. The University of London OTC is the largest UOTC with about 400 officer cadets. It has been based at Yeomanry House in Handel Street, London since 1992. In 2011, Canterbury Company was founded to recruit officer Cadets from the Kent area.

Northumbrian

Durham University formed the "K" Company of the 3rd Battalion, Northumberland Fusiliers in 1908. With the formation of the Officers' Training Corps later in that year, this was transferred to the OTC. The UOTC sent a detachment to London to act as part of the Guard of honour at the coronation of King George V in June 1911. Some 2,464 members of Durham University (including Armstrong College and the College of Medicine in Newcastle, both now part of Newcastle University) served in the First World War, with 325 being killed, along with 525 members of Bede College (then an associated college rather than part of the university), of whom 91 were killed. In a serious accident in April 1955, four officer cadets from the UOTC were killed when they were hit by a de Havilland Chipmunk at Otterburn.

Following the creation of Newcastle University (formerly King's College, Durham University) in 1963, the unit became the "Northumbrian Universities Officers Training Corps": it was initially based at the Yeomanry Drill Hall in Northumberland Road in Newcastle, but moved to St George's Army Reserve Centre in Sandyford Road, Jesmond in 1975 and then moved again to St. Cuthbert's Keep at Holland Drive in Fenham in the 1990s.

Leeds

In January 1909, the Leeds University contingent of the Officers' Training Corps was formally raised in response to the recommendations of the committee formed by Lord Haldane. The contingent was initially based at Woodhouse Lodge. During the First World War some 1,596 officers were recruited from Leeds University: of these some 328 were killed. The contingent received an inspection by King George V on 27 September 1915. Captain David Hirsch, a former member of the contingent, was posthumously awarded the Victoria Cross for his actions on the Western Front during the First World War.

Leeds UOTC is based at Carlton Barracks in Leeds. Since September 2011 it has formed part of the Yorkshire Officer Training Regiment.

Liverpool
The Liverpool University contingent of the Officers' Training Corps was formed in 1919 to provide military training for the students of the University of Liverpool. It occupied its own drill hall from 1928 and was re-organised on a faculty basis at the start of the Second World War but was re-unified again in 1955. At the turn of the century it was based at 128 Mount Pleasant in Liverpool but is now based at Crawford Hall in Allerton. Since September 2011 it has formed part of the North West Officer Training Regiment.

Manchester and Salford
In 1898 the University of Manchester raised a company, sanctioned by the War Office, which was known as N Company of the 2nd Volunteer Battalion, Manchester Regiment. In 1908 N Company became the Manchester University contingent of the Officers' Training Corps. Some 314 members of Manchester University died in the First World War and another 200 members of the university died in the Second World War. The unit was based at a Drill Hall in Stretford Road, but since 1994, has been based at University Barracks in Boundary Lane, Manchester 15. Since September 2011 it has formed part of the North West Officer Training Regiment.

Oxford

Oxford UOTC claims descent from the bodyguard to Charles I that students of the University of Oxford formed in 1642, during the English Civil War. But the immediate origin of the present body is the 1st Oxfordshire (Oxford University) Rifle Volunteer Corps, formed in 1859 and established (together with many other volunteer corps across the country) in response to the threat of war with France. From 1881, the OURVC served as one of several volunteer battalions of the Oxfordshire Light Infantry and in 1887 it became known as the 1st (Oxford University) Volunteer Battalion or the Oxford University Volunteers (OUV).

In 1908, the Oxford University contingent of the Officers' Training Corps was formally raised in response to the recommendations of the committee formed by Lord Haldane. From 1912 to 1918, the Oxford OTC was commanded by John Stenning, a fellow of Wadham College, Oxford. In September 1914, at the start of the First World War the university processed some 2,000 applications for commissions in the British Army and another 3,000 subsequently passed through its School of Instruction. The OTC was based at Yeomanry House in Manor Road from 1929, but moved to Harcourt House in Marston Road from 1994 and moved again to purpose-built facilities at Falklands House in Oxpens Road in 1998.

Queen's
In October 1908, the Queen's University contingent of the Officers' Training Corps was formally raised in response to the recommendations of the committee formed by Lord Haldane. Parades were held in the old gymnasium which occupied the site of the former Drill Hall located south of the Queen's University Belfast Students' Union. A Drill Hall was subsequently built at the cost of £4,000 and officially opened on 20 November 1912 by Brigadier General Count Gleichen, who deputised for the Commander-in-Chief of the Forces in Ireland.

During the First World War, training was increased for UOTC members being commissioned into newly formed battalions.  By the end of the war almost 1,200 commissions had been obtained by cadets who had passed through the ranks of the contingent. In 1930 the Corps' title was changed to the "Queen's University, Belfast Contingent of the Officers' Training Corps".  A Reception Unit and a Joint Recruiting Board were set up in the Drill Hall to deal with applications for commissions during the Second World War. Queen's UOTC is based at Tyrone House in Malone Road, Belfast.

Sheffield

In 1900 staff from the University of Sheffield raised a company, sanctioned by the War Office, which was known as G Company of the West Yorkshire Royal Engineers. In 1911, the Sheffield University contingent of the Officers' Training Corps was formally raised in response to the recommendations of the committee formed by Lord Haldane. Lieutenant William Allen, a former member of the contingent, was awarded the Victoria Cross for his actions on the Western Front during the First World War.

From 1969 the UOTC began recruiting students from Sheffield Hallam University as well as Sheffield University. Sheffield UOTC is based at Somme Barracks in Sheffield. Since September 2011 it has formed part of the Yorkshire Officer Training Regiment.

Southampton

In November 1902 twenty students from Hartley University College raised a company, sanctioned by the War Office, which formed part of the 2nd Volunteer Battalion of the Hampshire Regiment. Members of the company were commissioned into the 5th Battalion of the Hampshire Regiment in 1914 and served on the Western Front during the First World War.

A separate UOTC was formed in Southampton in November 1937, and the relationship with the Hampshire Regiment discontinued. However, after supplying significant numbers officers to the British Army during the Second World War, recruitment fell and the UOTC was placed in suspended animation in April 1951. The UOTC was reformed in October 1979 and moved to its present premises at Carlton Place in Southampton in 1981.

Tayforth

The origins of the University of St Andrews' links with the military can be traced back to the Jacobite risings of 1715 and 1745, when companies of Militia were raised to defend the pro-Hanoverian University and the City of St Andrews against the absolutist Highland Jacobites. In 1859 a committee was formed in St Andrews to form a volunteer corps of both rifle and artillery. This was carried in a town meeting on 5 December 1859 and was carried unanimously and 3rd (St Andrews) Fife Artillery Volunteers was formed. In November 1908, the St Andrews University contingent of the Officers' Training Corps was formally raised in response to the recommendations of the committee formed by Lord Haldane.

Following the formation of Dundee University from University College Dundee, a part of the University of St Andrews in 1967, the unit became the St Andrews and Dundee UOTC. With the Addition of Stirling University the UOTC was renamed Tayforth UOTC, as St Andrews, Dundee and Stirling Universities OTC was considered a bit of a mouthful. The name Tayforth was chosen as Dundee is situated on the River Tay and Stirling on the River Forth. The concern at the time was that St Andrews, as the senior university might not agree with this name, however as the River Tay and the River Forth are the boundaries of the Kingdom of Fife, within which St Andrews is located, it was approved by the MEC.

In May 1976, the Old Wyvernians formed as a regimental association for the former officer cadets of St Andrews UOTC. The inaugural meeting of the Tayforth Regimental Association was held on 16 June 1984, and was the first of its kind. Whilst other UOTCs followed the example, the Tayforth Regimental Association is the oldest of its kind. Tayforth UOTC is based at Park Wynd in Dundee.

Wales

In 1900 University College, Wales in Aberystwyth raised a company, sanctioned by the War Office, which was known as E Company of the 5th Volunteer Battalion, South Wales Borderers. In 1908, the University College, Wales contingent of the Officers' Training Corps was formally raised in response to the recommendations of the committee formed by Lord Haldane. In 1910, the University College of North Wales contingent followed and, in 1913, the University College of South Wales and Monmouthshire contingent was also raised. The UOTCs of Aberystwyth and Bangor supplied officers to the British Army during the Second World War, but after the war recruitment fell and the UOTCs were suspended in October 1952 and March 1948 respectively.

Meanwhile, the University College of South Wales and Monmouthshire OTC had also supplied officers to the British Army during the Second World War but subsequently developed to become "Cardiff UOTC" and, in October 1990, it became "Wales UOTC". Wales UOTC is based at Maindy Barracks in Cardiff.

Training
Training follows a syllabus as laid out by the Royal Military Academy Sandhurst. Weekly training nights are used to build up theory and basic practical lessons. Training and exercises, usually at weekends, are structured around the academic calendar. Most activities take place during the winter and spring terms, with a two-week summer camp, scheduled early to allow for other commitments. Having successfully completed basic training, the amount of time cadets commit to activities depends on the amount of time they can spare. UOTC Cadets remain on the untrained strength meaning remuneration does not attract X Factor and is not pensionable.

Training varies depending on the OTC, but the same basic content is covered. There are two Military Training Qualification tests to take in the first two years, involving written and practical tests.

Year one: Basic training (MOD Alpha)
This year involves instruction in all basic military techniques, including drill, map reading, camouflage, first aid, weapons training, small unit tactics, radio procedure, and fieldcraft.

Year two: Leadership training (MOD Bravo)  
Having learnt how to be a member of an effective military team, the second year teaches cadets how to manage soldiers, equipment, and the battlefield. This involves everything from planning an attack, to giving effective orders and ensuring they are carried out and from directing a constructive debrief after an exercise to ensuring the welfare of all of those under command.

Year three: Leadership in action
Some cadets choose to go forward for officer selection, either in the Regular Army or Army Reserve.

Adventurous training and social life
Concurrently with military training, many OTCs provide the opportunity to pursue sporting and adventurous hobbies. Sports such as skiing, mountain trekking, climbing, and sailing are actively encouraged. With access to the Army Reserve's resources for adventurous training, students are enabled to pursue their other hobbies alongside their degrees. Socially, the OTCs hold frequent parties and informal social events throughout the year which attracts local press coverage. Social events and cheap alcohol are a significant element of UOTCs' offer to students and a focus of their recruitment.

Inter-OTC competitions
The British Army runs several competitions throughout the academic year where the OTCs and the four Defence Technical Undergraduate Scheme (DTUS) squadrons have a chance to compete against each other. One of these is the Queen's Challenge Cup, a sports competition.

Bans
In January 1972, at the height of the Troubles, a meeting of 1,500 students at University of Manchester banned the OTC from carrying out activities anywhere on the university campus.

In March 2008, a motion was passed during the University College London Union's annual general meeting to ban armed forces groups and societies such as the University Royal Naval Unit (URNU), Officers' Training Corps (OTC) and University Air Squadron (UAS) from operating within UCLU locations and events. Through a subsequent motion passed through the Union Council, the decisions made at the annual general meeting were ratified; however, the ban was subsequently overturned by a large majority in following year's AGM of 27 February 2009.

In April 2008 the University of Manchester tabled a proposal to ban military recruitment which also received press attention: however, this proposal ultimately failed.

See also
University Royal Naval Unit (URNU) - organisational counterpart in the Royal Navy
University Air Squadron (UAS) - organisational counterpart in the Royal Air Force
Defence Technical Undergraduate Scheme
Army Reserve Officers' Training Corps, the United States equivalent

Notes

References
 
 
 Eltringham, G.J., Nottingham University Officers' Training Corps 1909-1964. Privately published. 1964.
 Errington, Colonel F.H.L., Inns of Court Officers Training Corps During the Great War. Naval and Military Press. New edition of 1920 edition. 2001.
 Hankins, Harold C.A., A History of the Manchester and Salford Universities Officers Training Corps 1898-2002. DP & G Military Publishers. 2002.
 Maj-Gen J.M. Grierson, Records of the Scottish Volunteer Force 1859–1908, Edinburgh:Blackwood, 1909.
 Johnston, Herbert John, The Queen's University (Belfast) Contingent of the Officers Training Corps: Sixty years of the O.T.C.: diamond jubilee 1908-1968. Queen's University OTC. 1968.
 Norman Litchfield & Ray Westlake, The Volunteer Artillery 1859–1908 (Their Lineage, Uniforms and Badges), Nottingham: Sherwood Press, 1982, .
 
 Strachan, Hew, History of the Cambridge University Officers Training Corps. Midas Books. 1976. .
 University of London. University of London Officers Training Corps, Roll of War Service 1914-1919. Privately published. 2010. .
 Westlake, Ray, Tracing the Rifle Volunteers, Barnsley: Pen and Sword, 2010, .
 Willoughby, Roger Talbot . Military History of the University of Dublin and its Officers' Training Corps 1910-22. Medal Society of Ireland. 1989. .

External links
UOTC official page on the Army website
ULOTC archives - University of London Officers Training Corps archives
COMEC - Council of Military Education Committees, who liaise between universities and the British Armed Forces

 
Training establishments of the British Army
University organisations of the British Armed Forces